The Denmark News is a weekly newspaper based in Denmark, Wisconsin.

The newspaper primarily serves Denmark, Maribel, and Kellnersville, and is distributed throughout Brown, Kewaunee, and Manitowoc Counties.

History
The paper began as a joint venture between local businessmen Ryan Radue and Mark Hansen, who decided to start the paper soon after Gannett Company ceased publication of the former Denmark Press in 2008. Many of the staff members of the former paper were hired by Radue and Hansen for their new paper.

The paper is now owned and operated by Chris Nelson and Nelson Media Company. Kelly Fenton is the sports editor. 

The newspaper is a member of the Wisconsin Newspaper Association.

References

Brown County, Wisconsin
Newspapers published in Wisconsin
2009 establishments in Wisconsin